Dance is the fifth studio album by American country rock band Pure Prairie League, released by RCA Records in 1976.

Track listing

Side A
"Dance" (George Powell) – 3:21
"In the Morning" (Larry & Tim Goshorn) – 3:02
"All the Way" (Loe, Perry, Reilly) – 3:43
"Living Each Day" (Larry Goshorn) – 2:48
"Fade Away" (Larry Goshorn, Michael Reilly) – 4:12

Side B
"Tornado Warning" (Powell) – 3:19
"Catfishin'" (Larry Goshorn) – 2:20
"Help Yourself" (Larry Goshorn, Michael Reilly) – 3:35
"San Antonio" (Powell) – 3:26
"All the Lonesome Cowboys" (Tim Goshorn) – 3:21

Personnel
Pure Prairie League
George Ed Powell - guitar, vocals
Larry Goshorn - guitar, vocals
John David Call - steel guitar, banjo, dobro, vocals
Michael Connor - keyboards
Michael Reilly - bass, vocals
William Frank (aka, Billy) Hinds - drums
Additional personnel

Andy Stein - violin on "In the Morning"
Charles Veal, Jr. - concertmaster
Clarence McDonald - horn arrangements
David Campbell - string arrangements
Acy Lehman - art direction
Barney Plotkin - cover illustration

Production
Producers: Alan V. Abrahams, John Boylan
Engineer: Richie Schmitt

Charts
Album - Billboard (United States)

Pure Prairie League albums
1976 albums
Albums arranged by David Campbell (composer)
Albums produced by John Boylan (record producer)
RCA Records albums